Obedience thru Suffering is the debut studio album by the American sludge metal band Crowbar, released in 1991.

Track listing

Music videos
"Subversion"

Line-up
Kirk Windstein – vocals, rhythm guitar
Kevin Noonan – lead guitar
Todd Strange – bass
Craig Nunenmacher – drums

References

Crowbar (American band) albums
1991 debut albums